Record Store Day is an annual event inaugurated in 2007 and held on one Saturday (typically the third) every April and every Black Friday in November to "celebrate the culture of the independently owned record store". The day brings together fans, artists, and thousands of independent record stores around the world. A number of records are pressed specifically for Record Store Day, with a list of releases for each country, and are only distributed to shops participating in the event.

Record Store Day is headquartered in the United States, where it began. Official organizers operate in the UK, Ireland, Mexico, Europe, Japan and Australia.

Background

Originally pitched as an idea to create an event similar to Free Comic Book Day by Bull Moose Music's Chris Brown and Criminal Record's Eric Levin, the concept for Record Store Day was created during a brainstorming session at a meeting of independent record store owners in Baltimore, Maryland. Record Store Day was founded in 2007 by Eric Levin, Michael Kurtz, Carrie Colliton, Amy Dorfman, Brian Poehner and Don Van Cleave, and is now celebrated at stores around the world, with hundreds of recording and other artists participating in the day by making special appearances, performances, meet and greets with their fans, the holding of fundraisers for community non-profits, and the issuing of special vinyl and CD releases along with other promotional offerings to mark the occasion.

Each store holds its own event for the day, to celebrate its place in its community. Although Record Store Day, the day, only occurs once a year, Record Store Day, the organization, provides promotions, marketing, and other opportunities for stores throughout the year, maintaining a website, social media and other means of promulgating its views about the value of independent record stores. Record Store Day is managed on a day-to-day basis by the Dept. of Record Stores, along with the Coalition of Independent Music Stores and the Alliance of Independent Media Stores.

Impact
Universal Music's sales manager, Marc Fayd’Herbe, has described Record Store Day as "the single best thing that has ever happened" for independent record shops. The 2013 event was credited with the highest U.S. vinyl sales, and the 2014 edition resulted in independent retailers recording the highest percentage of physical album sales, since the SoundScan system was introduced in 1991. In their 2015 Libera awards, the American Association of Independent Music awarded Record Store Day its "Marketplace Ally" award. Record Store Day 2016 produced the biggest week of sales for the vinyl LP format since the introduction of SoundScan.

In the UK, the event has been criticised for catering to record collectors, rather than casual music fans, and delaying the release of non-affiliated records by monopolizing the capacity of record pressing plants. Major labels have been accused of hijacking the event, and the policy of shops being obliged to buy on a no-return basis has been criticised, along with many of the limited releases being re-sold online within hours, at inflated prices.

Some shops have pushed for a reformat of the event, even suggesting that the initiative now risks damaging their businesses.

Record Store Day by year

2008
Metallica opened the event at Rasputin Music in Mountain View, California, on April 19, 2008. There were approximately 10 special Record Store Day releases in the first year, including releases by Death Cab For Cutie, R.E.M., Stephen Malkmus, Vampire Weekend, The Teenagers, Black Kids, and Jason Mraz. Approximately 300 stores launched Record Store Day in the United States.

English singer-songwriter Billy Bragg met Record Store Day co-founder Michael Kurtz in an airport and agreed to help kick off Record Store Day in the United Kingdom with a special live appearance. The first organized involvement by UK stores included Piccadilly Records (Manchester), Jumbo Records (Leeds), Resident (Brighton), Sister Ray (London), Rough Trade (London), Rapture (Witney), Spillers (Cardiff, Wales), and Avalanche Records (Edinburgh and Glasgow, Scotland).

2009
The second annual Record Store Day was celebrated on Saturday, April 18, 2009 with about 85 special releases and about 500 artist appearances, including those by Slayer, Tom Waits, Bob Dylan, Leonard Cohen, Iron & Wine, The Stooges, MC5, Wilco, Disturbed, Killswitch Engage, Erykah Badu, Talib Kweli, The Eagles of Death Metal.  Wilco made a surprise appearance on Record Store Day @ the Disc Exchange in Knoxville, Tennessee. Eagles of Death Metal made an appearance at Rhino Records. Mayor Mike Bloomberg announced that the City of New York officially recognized Record Store Day as a citywide event and the judges on American Idol talked about their favorite records in honor of Record Store Day in the episode of American Idol prior to the event. 95% of the special releases made for Record Store Day were for the US; however, the event began to grow internationally with over 1,000 record stores in the US, the UK, Ireland, Japan, Canada, Italy, Sweden, Norway, the Netherlands, and Germany all participating.

2010
The third annual Record Store Day took place on Saturday, April 17, 2010. The official ambassador for the event was Joshua Homme. The official book of the event was Last Shop Standing: Whatever Happened to Record Shops? by Graham Jones. KCRW's Gary Calamar and Phil Gallo also released their self-published book, "Record Store Days", about independent record stores, with artist quotes provided by www.recordstoreday.com used throughout the book, and a chapter devoted to Record Store Day. NYC Mayor Mike Bloomberg and New York City once again honored the day. Anything Anything with Rich Russo released a vinyl album of local bands performing on his radio show and organized a bus tour visiting New York and New Jersey record stores.  Several artists made in-store appearances to mark the event: The Smashing Pumpkins promoted their new album with a Record Store Day concert at Amoeba in Hollywood, CA. Other artists to announce special appearances included Frank Black, Exene Cervenka, Angie Stone, Jason Derulo, Alice in Chains, Mastodon, Josh Ritter, HIM, Slash, Sick Puppies, Care Bears on Fire, and Emmylou Harris. Young artists showcased their talent at the national "Record Store Day: High School Battle of the Bands" contest, in which participating independent record stores each selected and entered a track recorded by a local high school band. A panel of record executives and members from the Fender Corporation judged the entrants. Nine national semi-finalists were chosen to appear on a limited edition, compilation vinyl LP of their winning songs.  The grand prize winning band, SANUK, nominated by Indianapolis, Indiana record store Indy CD & Vinyl, received a package of musical gear from the Fender Corporation and recording time with Jack Ponti and Kevin "The Caveman" Shirley. The contest was sponsored by Caroline Distribution, EMI Label Services, Fender, and Fender Music Foundation.

Aside from the Band Battle contest, many participating record stores had a line-up of live talent performing throughout the day. In 2010, about 1,400 independent record stores participated, about 1,000 from the US. Record stores saw a 41% increase in sales over the previous year's celebration, and a 109% increase over the previous Saturday's sales. That year the event was referenced on Saturday Night Live. During the year, the first Black Friday Record Store Day was also held, on November 26, 2010.

2011
The fourth annual record store day took place on Saturday, April 16, 2011. The official ambassador for the event was Ozzy Osbourne. Over six hundred artists celebrated the event with in-store appearances, making it the world's largest music event of its kind. Artists who made in-store appearances included Beastie Boys, the Foo Fighters, Duran Duran, My Chemical Romance, Wiz Khalifa, Todd Rundgren, Anvil, Del McCoury and the New Orleans Preservation Hall Jazz Band, Regina Spektor, Jack White and Jerry Lee Lewis, the dBs, The Raveonettes, TV on the Radio, Frightened Rabbit, Deftones, Chuck D, the Beach Boys' Al Jardine, Lonely Island, and Josh Groban. Most of the releases for the year were limited between 300 and 7,000 copies worldwide.  According to Billboard magazine, the 182,000 bump in unit sales in the week that Record Store Day was held was directly attributed to the success of the event itself. The official film of the event was "Sound It Out", a feature-length documentary directed by Jeanie Finlay, documenting the Sound It Out Records shop in Stockton-on-Tees, the last record shop in Teesside. The film premiered to critical acclaim at SxSW and had its joint premiere at SheffDocFest and the Edinburgh International Film Festival. During the year, the second Black Friday Record Store Day was also held, on November 25, 2011. Additionally, this Record Store Day featured an exclusive 12" vinyl reissue of New Order's 1981 debut single "Ceremony" that included not only the song and its B side, "In a Lonely Place", but also the original 1980 demo recordings of those tracks by New Order's previous incarnation, Joy Division. This particular release was significant as it marked the first official release of the full Joy Division recording of "In a Lonely Place ", which had been recovered earlier that year.

2012
The fifth annual Record Store Day took place on Saturday, April 21, 2012. The official ambassador for the event was Iggy Pop. Over 400 different releases were made for the day. To coincide with Record Store Day 2012, the UK's Official Chart Company launched the Official Record Store Chart, a weekly music chart based solely on sales from independent record shops. The chart was first issued on April 20, 2012, the eve of Record Store Day 2012.
The CBC Radio show Day 6 hosted a panel discussing techniques and successes in tracking down obscure vinyl recordings.

2013
Ahead of the 2013 edition, held on April 20, Record Store Day co-founder Michael Kurtz was awarded a Chevalier des Arts et des Lettres, for his work on Record Store Day, by the French government. The official ambassador was Jack White of White Stripes fame and founder of Third Man Records. The White Stripes album Elephant was reissued in a limited edition 10th anniversary double LP, consisting of one black-and-red colored disc and one white disc, the band's signature tri-color scheme.

Boards of Canada used RSD 2013 to launch a viral marketing campaign for their much anticipated album, Tomorrow's Harvest, when a new vinyl record by the band was placed in a New York City record store for purchase. The record allegedly sold on eBay for $5,700 but the buyer ended up being a fraud. It was later sold in a closed auction for an undisclosed sum.

2014

Record Store Day 2014 was held on April 19, 2014. The ambassador for this year was Chuck D. Exclusive releases in the UK included Little Richard and Coldplay, and in the US, Chvrches, Soundgarden, Joan Jett, The Yardbirds, Tears For Fears, Death Grips and Cage the Elephant.

2015
Record Store Day 2015 was held on April 18, 2015. The ambassador for this event was Dave Grohl. Exclusive releases in the UK included Neal Hefti and Phil Collins; and in the US, Echosmith, The White Stripes, Twenty One Pilots, The Bee Gees, Foo Fighters, Buzzcocks, Taylor Swift and In This Moment.

2016
Record Store Day 2016 took place on April 16, 2016. Having kicked off the first Record Store Day with an in-store appearance, Metallica served as ambassador for the first time this year, marking the occasion with an album recorded live at the Bataclan in Paris, with all money raised going to victims of the terrorist attack at the venue the previous November. The band also reissued their first two albums, Kill 'Em All and Ride the Lightning, to coincide with the event. Exclusive releases included albums by David Bowie, Bob Dylan, Johnny Cash, Madonna, Gerard Way, Patti Smith, Deftones, Frank Zappa, and the Doors.

Singer Prince made what was to be one of his final public sightings at Electric Fetus, in Minneapolis, for Record Store Day. An image was taken by a shopper of Prince at the counter purchasing the last CDs he would ever buy. He died five days later at his studio/home of an accidental fentanyl overdose. The police investigation team took extensive photographs of his estate the day he died, including the stack of CDs purchased at Electric Fetus.

2017
Record Store Day 2017 took place on Saturday, April 22, 2017. The ambassador for the event was St. Vincent, making her the Day's first female ambassador. It was the tenth celebration of independent record stores. In a rare occurrence, the special releases in the United States included a classical title: a 1967 recording of Shostakovich's Cello Concerto No. 2 published by Warner Classics, pressed in the style of a Soviet Roentgenizdat. Live from Los Angeles by Brandy Clark was one of this year's releases.

2018
Record Store Day 2018 took place on Saturday, April 21, 2018. To celebrate, The Alarm visited stores in London, New York, and Los Angeles throughout the day. Special releases included albums by Prince, Ella Fitzgerald, and Bruce Springsteen, among others. The BBC released two full-cast television soundtracks of the Doctor Who serials The Tomb of the Cybermen and City of Death with newly commissioned gatefold artwork.  The ambassadors for the event were Run The Jewels.

2019
Record Store Day 2019 took place on April 13. Pearl Jam served as ambassadors and their album MTV Unplugged saw a limited release for the celebration. Special releases included the first reissue of Gorillaz' fourth album The Fall for the first time since 2011 on translucent forest green vinyl; a picture disc of Bohemian Rhapsody: The Original Soundtrack; KT Tunstall's Extra Wax; a picture disc of songs from films by Peter Gabriel; "Chasing You", the first single from J. J. Cale's posthumous album Stay Around; Live! Woodstock '94, the 25th anniversary of the Green Day performance; Live at the Borderline 1991 by R.E.M.; and Imagine (Raw Studio Mixes) by John Lennon; among other titles. Record Store Day 2019 exclusives included reissues of Death Grips’ Steroids (Crouching Tiger Hidden Gabber Megamix); Robyn's Body Talk; Aretha Franklin's The Atlantic Singles 1967; and other titles. Record Store Day Black Friday was on November 29.

San Diego’s Blind Owl Records announced a poetry reading at the Vinyl Junkies Record Shack alongside the celebration of Record Store Day. Blind Owl Records’ believed that records and books fall into the same category of an object that you hold in your hand and appreciate; poetry sounds like music and music sounds like poetry. The book read was Saturday Night Sage by North Park writer Noah Lekas, the book is supposed to have “glimmers of the Doors’ mysticism, Bob Dylan’s street-corner truth-telling and Patti Smith’s punk rhapsodies.”

2020
Record Store Day 2020 was scheduled to take place on April 18, but was postponed to June 20 due to the COVID-19 pandemic. On April 29, it was announced that Record Store Day would be postponed again, and spread across three dates called RSD Drops: August 29, September 26, and October 24. A fourth date, RSD Black Friday, occurred on November 27. Planned releases include the special 50th anniversary release of Paul McCartney's debut solo album McCartney in a limited edition half-speed mastered vinyl pressing.

2021
Record Store Day 2021 took place, as RSD Drops, across two dates: June 12 and July 17, with Fred Armisen as the Ambassador. A 'Black Friday' Fall edition of Record Store Day 2021 took place on November 26, 2021.

2022 
Record Store Day announced Taylor Swift as its first-ever global ambassador, for its 15th anniversary celebrations, and took place on April 23, 2022.  An RSD Drops date also took place on June 18, 2022 to release items that were either delayed in production or could not be made in time for Record Store Day in April.

2023 
Record Store Day 2023 will take place on Saturday 22nd April. It will feature Jason Isbell and Amanda Shires as ambassadors and includes 'folklore: the long pond studio sessions' by Taylor Swift in vinyl format.

See also

References

External links

 
Unofficial observances
April observances
Recurring events established in 2007
2008 establishments in California
Mountain View, California
Holidays and observances by scheduling (nth weekday of the month)
2008 introductions
November observances